Óscar Isaula (born 9 November 1982 in Tegucigalpa, Honduras) is a retired Honduran-Guatemalan football forward.

He was part of the Guatemala national football team for the 2011 CONCACAF Gold Cup, and played in two matches.

References

1982 births
Living people
Guatemalan footballers
Guatemala international footballers
Association football forwards
2011 CONCACAF Gold Cup players
Sportspeople from Tegucigalpa
Honduran emigrants to Guatemala
Deportivo Marquense players
C.D. Malacateco players
Aurora F.C. players
Deportivo Jalapa players
Deportivo Zacapa players
C.S.D. Municipal players
Heredia Jaguares de Peten players
Antigua GFC players